Tey (also Romanized as Ţey; also known as Tappeh Tey and Tappeh Tī) is a village in Dorud Rural District, in the Central District of Dorud County, Lorestan Province, Iran. At the 2006 census, its population was 181, in 29 families.

References 

Towns and villages in Dorud County